The European Union Agency for Fundamental Rights, usually known in English as the Fundamental Rights Agency (FRA), is a Vienna-based agency of the European Union inaugurated on 1 March 2007. It was established by Council Regulation (EC) No 168/2007 of 15 February 2007.

Mandate
The FRA is an EU body tasked with "collecting and analysing data on fundamental rights with reference to, in principle, all rights listed in the Charter"; however, it is intended to focus particularly on "the thematic areas within the scope of EU law".

Those nine thematic areas are defined by Council Decision No 252/2013/EU of 11 March 2013, establishing a Multiannual Framework for 2013–2017 for the Agency. They are: access to justice; victims of crime; information society; Roma integration; judicial co-operation; rights of the child; discrimination; immigration and integration of migrants; and racism and xenophobia.

The FRA's primary methods of operation are surveys, reports, provision of expert assistance to EU bodies, member states, and EU candidate countries and potential candidate countries, and raising awareness about fundamental rights. The FRA is not mandated to intervene in individual cases but rather to investigate broad issues and trends.

History
The FRA was established in 2007 as the successor to the European Monitoring Centre on Racism and Xenophobia (EUMC), which was also based in Vienna. The EUMC's mandate was narrower than that of the FRA, as it was restricted to issues of racism and xenophobia.

The EUMC grew from the Commission on Racism and Xenophobia (CRX), established in 1994, and also known as the Kahn Commission. The CRX was transformed into the EUMC in June 1998; officially established by Council Regulation (EC) No 1035/97 of 2 June 1997.

Publications and surveys
Since its inception, the FRA has carried out surveys and  published reports which are available online. A full list of publications is given on Publications & resources > Publications. This section discusses reports that have seen significant attention from outside observers.

Survey: Violence against Women
In March 2014, FRA published a major survey on violence against women, based on face-to-face interviews with over 42,000 women from across the 28 Member States of the EU. The survey asked about their experiences of physical, sexual and psychological violence including incidents of intimate partner violence ('domestic violence'). Questions also asked about incidents of stalking, sexual harassment and online harassment as well as their experience of violence in childhood.

According to the responses of the report some of the key findings indicated that:
 33% of women had experienced physical and/or sexual violence since the age of 15;
22% had experienced physical and/or sexual violence by a partner;
5% had been raped, and;
33% had childhood experiences of physical or sexual violence at the hands of an adult.

Survey: EU-MIDIS (Minorities and Discrimination)
In 2009, FRA released a survey on the experiences of discrimination, racist crime, and policing of minority group and immigration groups in the EU. The survey was based on the responses of 23,000 individuals from selected ethnic minority and immigrant groups, and additionally, 5,000 people from the majority population living in the same areas as minorities in 10 Member States.
Key findings of the survey include that:
 55% of respondents thought that discrimination based on ethnic origin is widespread in their country, with 37% saying that they had experienced discrimination in the past 12 months;
12% said they had personally experienced a racist crime in the past 12 months, however 80% did not report the incident to the police;
 Roma reported the highest levels of discrimination, with one in two respondents saying that they were discriminated against in the last 12 months, and;
 high levels of discrimination were also mentioned by Sub-Saharan Africans (41%) and North Africans (36%).
A second round of the survey (EU-MIDIS II) is currently underway, and the results will be published in 2016. This will collect comparable data, and assess the impact of national anti-discrimination and equality legislation and policies in the EU.

Survey: European Union lesbian, gay, bisexual and transgender survey 
In 2013, FRA conducted an online survey to identify how lesbian, gay, bisexual and transgender (LGBT) people living in the European Union experience the fulfilment of their fundamental rights. This followed a 2009 report on homophobia and discrimination on grounds of sexual orientation or gender identity which identified the need for comparative data on this issue.
The results reflect the experiences of more than 93,000 individuals who completed the online survey across Europe. The aim was to support the development of more effective laws and policies to fight discrimination, violence and harassment, improving equal treatment across society.

From the findings, it was noted that:
2 out of 3 LGBT respondents were hid or disguised being LGBT at school;
19% of respondents felt discriminated against at work or when looking for a job, despite legal protection under EU law, and;
More than 1/4 of LGBT people who answered the survey had been attacked or threatened with violence in the last five years, while more than half of these did not report the incident.

A second round of the survey (EU-LGBTI II) is currently underway, and the results will be published in 2020. This will collect comparable data in order to compare the results with the prior survey.

Methodology
The online survey methodology was chosen to ensure the anonymity of ‘hard-to-reach’ or ‘closeted’ LGBT populations, to encourage reporting of sensitive or negative experiences, such as criminal victimisation, and eliminate bias, which could have been introduced by telephone or face-to-face interview approaches.
Multiple responses were discouraged through the length (approximately 30 minutes) and complexity of the survey, while the input process in the different countries was closely monitored for falsifications. The results are not intended to be representative of all LGBT people in the EU, but provide the largest collection of empirical evidence on the experiences of LGBT people in Europe to date.
Data about the perceptions of discrimination on grounds of sexual orientation or gender identity of the general public was not included in the survey, as it is already collected by Eurobarometer. The analysis of the results in the EU LGBT survey – Main results report compares some Eurobarometer data with the EU LGBT survey results.

Survey: Roma
The Agency has a multi-annual Roma programme to allow it "to make regular reports on progress made and provide evidence based advice to the EU institutions and Member States based on data systematically collected across the EU". Data from the 2011 Roma survey is available via an online data explorer tool.

Publications of the EUMC
EUMC published reports are available from the website here of the FRA, the EUMC successor agency. A selection is given below.

Report: Working Definition of Antisemitism

In 2005, the EUMC published a working definition of antisemitism, whose stated purpose was to "provide a guide for identifying incidents, collecting data and supporting the implementation and enforcement of legislation dealing with antisemitism". In November 2013 the definition was removed from the organisation's website in 'a clear-out of non-official documents'. A spokesperson stated that the document had never been viewed as a valid definition and that "We are not aware of any official definition".

Report: Rise in antisemitic attacks in the EU
In May 2004, a report labeled 'Manifestations of antisemitism in the EU 2002 – 2003' was published.
It detailed a rise in attacks targeting Jewish businesses, synagogues, cemeteries and individuals. The countries with the most significant number of attacks were Belgium, France, Germany, the Netherlands and the United Kingdom. A second report, on perceptions of antisemitism, was also published.

Report: Rise of Islamophobic attacks in the EU following 9/11

The largest monitoring project ever to be commissioned regarding Islamophobia was undertaken following 9/11 by the European Monitoring Centre on Racism and Xenophobia (EUMC).

From a total of 75 reports, 15 from each member state, a synthesis report, entitled "Summary report on Islamophobia in the EU after 11 September 2001", was published in May 2002.
The report highlighted occasions in which citizens abused and sometimes violently attacked Muslims. Discrimination included verbal abuse, indiscriminately accusing Muslims of responsibility for the attacks, removing women's hijab, spitting, using the name "Usama" as a pejorative epithet, and assaults. The report concluded that "a greater receptivity towards anti-Muslim and other xenophobic ideas and sentiments has, and may well continue, to become more tolerated".

Reception 

The need for a new human rights institution was questioned given that human rights policy was a principal concern of the Council of Europe (CoE), of which all EU member states were also members. In 2007 the British Conservative MEP Syed Kamall said: "The Fundamental Rights Agency will take £20m (30m euros) of taxpayers' money and use it to advance a partisan agenda with little accountability to anyone". In 2010 the German newspaper Die Welt reported that the centre-right French politician Pierre Lellouche, then EU minister in the Sarkozy government, questioned "the added value" of the FRA when the Council of Europe already took care of human rights.

A Resolution adopted in September 2009, in which the EP condemned a "Law on the Protection of Minors", which was then under discussion in Lithuania, as "homophobic" and requested the FRA to issue a legal opinion on whether the draft law was compatible with the EU Charter of Fundamental Rights. The Lithuanian Parliament, however, responded by adopting a Resolution that condemned the EP's Resolution as an "illegal act" (pointing to the fact that the FRA explicitly has no mandate to examine the legislation adopted by Member States) and requesting the Lithuanian Government to take legal action against the EP before the European Court of Justice.

See also
All-Party Parliamentary Group against Anti-Semitism 
Charter of Fundamental Rights of the European Union
Committee on Civil Liberties, Justice and Home Affairs
Committee on the Elimination of Racial Discrimination
Committee on Women's Rights and Gender Equality
European Commission against Racism and Intolerance
European Commissioner for Employment, Social Affairs & Equal Opportunities
European Commissioner for Justice, Freedom & Security
European Court of Justice
LGBT rights in the European Union

References

External links
Agency website
The European Fundamental Rights Agency comes into existence on 1 March 2007
The EU Fundamental Rights Agency: Satellite or Guiding Star? Raison d'etre, tasks and challenges of the EU's new agency Details and analysis by Stiftung Wissenschaft und Politik
Council Regulation (EC) No 168/2007 of 15 February 2007

Agencies of the European Union
Anti-racist organizations in Europe
Opposition to antisemitism in Europe
Anti-Islam sentiment in Europe
Discrimination in Europe
Intergovernmental human rights organizations
2007 establishments in Austria
2007 in the European Union
International organisations based in Vienna
Discrimination against LGBT people